Roman Yaroslavovych Virastyuk (20 April 1968 – 27 July 2019) was a Ukrainian shot putter, best known for his bronze medal at the 1994 European Athletics Championships and the sixth place at the 1996 Olympic Games. His personal best was 21.34 metres, achieved in May 2000 in Ivano-Frankivsk. He was a brother of Vasyl Virastyuk.

International competitions

References

External links

 
  Interview with Roman Virastyuk

1968 births
2019 deaths
Sportspeople from Ivano-Frankivsk
Ukrainian male shot putters
Olympic athletes of Ukraine
Athletes (track and field) at the 1996 Summer Olympics
Athletes (track and field) at the 2000 Summer Olympics
Athletes (track and field) at the 2004 Summer Olympics
World Athletics Championships athletes for Ukraine
European Athletics Championships medalists